Nuvvostanante Nenoddantana is a 2005 Indian Telugu-language romantic comedy film directed by Prabhu Deva in his directorial debut and produced by M. S. Raju under Sumanth Art Productions who gave the screenplay as well. The film stars Srihari, Siddharth, and Trisha. The music is composed by Devi Sri Prasad with cinematography by Venu.

Veeru Potla wrote the story that is inspired from the 1989 Hindi film Maine Pyar Kiya, where an affluent boy travels to the village of his girlfriend against their parent's wishes to prove his love. The film's title was inspired by the song of the same name from Varsham (2004), sung by K. S. Chithra.

The film won nine Filmfare Awards South (including Best Film) and five Nandi Awards. The film was remade in nine other languages—the highest for any Indian film. The film also has the distinction of receiving most Filmfare awards by any South Indian film.

Plot
Siri is a traditional, simple, rural girl from Andhra Pradesh who is brought up by her only older brother Sivaramakrishna. Twenty years prior, their rich father from a nearby town married another woman and kicked the rest of Siri's family, humiliating them on the way. Their mother dies leaving toddler Siri in the care of 13-year-old Sivaramakrishna. With help of relatives, her grave is built on the small land which the siblings inherited, but the Zamindar Narasimha tells them that it is his land, since their mother had not repaid a loan from the man. Sivaramakrishna begs Narasimma and asks for an extension promising to work day and night to pay off the loan, as long as they don't tear down his mother's grave. Narasimha agrees upon security from the local station master. Slowly, Sivaramakrishna turns the tables using his handwork and becomes a rich enough farmer, and Siri grows up to complete engineering in a nearby town. One day, Lalitha, Siri's best friend from school time comes to their house to invite Siri to their house as she is getting married. Sivaramakrishna agrees to send Siri a week ahead of the marriage. Santosh, Lalitha's cousin, a rich city boy born to millionaire parents Janaki and Prakash and brought up in London, also arrives on the same day with his mother.

Slowly, Santosh and Siri fall in love, but Janaki does not bear it as Siri is a poor girl, and thus does not meet their standards. Santosh is also to be married to Janaki's brother Srinivasa Rao's business partner's daughter Dolly. When Sivaramakrishna arrives at the wedding, Janaki humiliates him as well as Siri. Both are thrown of the house after Janaki accuses them of trying to entice and trap Santosh. When Santosh learns of this, he goes to Siri's house and pleads to her brother to accept him. Sivaramakrishna gives him a chance, just like he was given a chance by Narasimha when he was a child. Santosh is tasked to take care of the cows, clean up after them, and grow more crops than Sivaramakrishna by the end of the season; if he does not, Santosh shall leave the village forever and never see Siri again. Narasimha and his son are not happy as Narasimha's son wanted to marry Siri. With them, Dolly, and her father trying to get Santosh to lose the competition, Santosh has to work hard for his love, eating red chillies and rice every day, even though he can't bear it. In spite of many antics from Narasimha's and Dolly's side, Santosh eventually proves his love for Siri to Sivaramakrishna and succeeds in growing more grain. However, Narasimha and his son kidnap Siri and then try to force her to marry his son. A fight takes place in which Santosh kills Narasimha's son while Sivaramakrishna violently defeats Santosh's uncle's business partner and Narasimha. After realizing that Santosh and Siri should be together, Sivaramakrishna takes the blame for this murder and spends five years in prison.

Sivaramakrishna is released from prison after five years and Janaki accepts Siri to be her daughter-in-law. Siri and Santosh get married, in everyone's presence.

Cast

Production 
M. S. Raju brought in Prabhu Deva, who choreographed the song "Nuvvostanante" in his production Varsham, to direct the film although Deva was hesitant to direct a film. Raju initially wanted to name the film O Prema Nuvvostanante Nenoddantana, but decided against it because the title was relatively long.

Soundtrack

The soundtrack features eight songs composed by Devi Sri Prasad.
The soundtrack featured a remixed version of the song "Prema Kosamai Volalo" sung by Ghantasala for the 1951 film Pathala Bhairavi. This version was sung by Jr. Ghantasala. All lyrics were penned by Sirivennela Seetharama Sastry.

Release
The film was released with 90 prints on 14 January 2005; more prints were added later to meet the public demand. It was one of the biggest hit of 2005 in Telugu cinema. The film ran for 50 days in 79 centres and 100 days in 35 centres, becoming a blockbuster in Telugu cinema. After the film's success, Siddharth shifted his focus to Telugu films.

Reception 
Sify which rated the film 3/5, stated that, "Nuvvostanante Nenoddantana a real treat and a joy to watch on screen." The reviewer praising performances of the cast, wrote: "Although the characters are built on obvious cliches, the charming performance of artists bring these seemingly archetypes to life" Idlebrain.com rated 4/5 and opined, "Screenplay provided by MS Raju is gripping. He made sure that there is no dull moment throughout the film. Direction by Prabhudeva is really good."

Accolades

Remakes 
This film was highly successful and was remade in 9 languages. This is the highest number for an Indian movie to be remade in other languages.

 Tamil as Unakkum Enakkum (2006) 
 Kannada as Neenello Naanalle (2006)
 Bengali as I Love You (2007) 
 Manipuri as Ningol Thajaba (2007)
 Odia as Suna Chadhei Mo Rupa Chadhei (2009) 
 Punjabi as Tera Mera Ki Rishta (2009)
 Bangladeshi Bengali as Nissash Amar Tumi (2010) 
 Nepali as The Flash Back: Farkera Herda (2010)
 Hindi as Ramaiya Vastavaiya (2013)

Notes

References

External links

2005 films
2000s Telugu-language films
2005 directorial debut films
Films directed by Prabhu Deva
Telugu films remade in other languages
Indian romantic comedy films
2005 romantic comedy films